Lilian Pauline Neville-Jones, Baroness Neville-Jones  (born 2 November 1939) is a British politician and former civil servant who served as Chairman of the Joint Intelligence Committee (JIC) from 1993 to 1994. A member of the Conservative Party, she served on the National Security Council and was Minister of State for Security and Counter Terrorism at the Home Office from 2010 to 2011.

On 12 May 2010, Prime Minister David Cameron appointed her as Minister of State for Security and Counter Terrorism in the Home Office with a permanent position on the newly created National Security Council.

On 9 May 2011, the BBC reported that Neville-Jones had left her role as Security Minister at "her own request"; her security brief was taken over by James Brokenshire.  She was then immediately appointed as "Special Representative to Business on Cyber Security".

Education
Lady Neville-Jones was educated at Leeds Girls' High School and Lady Margaret Hall, Oxford (Modern History).

Career

Civil Service
Neville-Jones was a career member of Her Majesty's Diplomatic Service from 1963 to 1996, during which time she served in British Missions in Rhodesia, Singapore, Washington, DC and Bonn. Between 1977 and 1982 she was seconded to the European Commission where she worked as Deputy and then Chef de Cabinet to Commissioner Christopher Tugendhat.

From 1991 to 1994 she was Head of the Defence and Overseas Secretariat in the Cabinet Office and Deputy Secretary to the Cabinet. During 1993 and 1994 she was Chairman of the Joint Intelligence Committee. From 1994, until her retirement, she was Political Director in the Foreign and Commonwealth Office, in which capacity she led the British delegation to the Dayton negotiations on the Bosnia peace settlement. In 2003 the Bosnian leader Alija Izetbegović commented that during these negotiations she "never tried to conceal her dislike for us".

BBC
She was appointed a BBC governor in January 1998. Her final post was as chairman of the Governors' World Service Consultative Group. Neville-Jones was chairman of the Audit Committee from 1998 until standing down from that position in September 2004 and left the BBC on 31 December 2004.

Defence
From 2002 to 2005, Neville-Jones was non-executive chairman of the part Government-owned defence technology company QinetiQ, which was privatised for £1.3 billion in February 2006.  She was chairman of the Information Assurance Advisory Council until 2007.

Politics

In January 2006 she joined one of the Conservative Party's new 'policy groups' on national security.

On 2 July 2007 her appointment as a working peer and Shadow Security Minister was announced. Her title was gazetted as Baroness Neville-Jones, of Hutton Roof in the County of Cumbria on 15 October 2007.

On 9 January 2009, Lady Neville-Jones warned that Israel's ongoing war in the Gaza Strip would encourage revolutionary Islamism in Arab countries and Islamic terrorism beyond, and called for a revival of the Middle East peace process.

On 13 May 2010, she was appointed Minister of State for Security and Counter Terrorism in David Cameron's Conservative–Liberal Democrat coalition government, and was also sworn of the Privy Council.

On 31 March 2011 she told The Daily Telegraph that Britain's Muslim population needs to be persuaded by the Government that Britain is a single nation, and that they can't just "rub along together" but must be persuaded that their long-term future lies in Britain. Neville-Jones later spoke out against "internet hate preaching and jihadist rhetoric", arguing that the murder of Lee Rigby was likely to have been inspired by such material.

On 9 May 2011, Neville-Jones left her post as Minister of State for Security and Counter-Terrorism in the Home Office at her own request.

In November 2014, Neville-Jones presented a speech at the Halifax International Security Forum, which she prefaced with an op-ed in a Toronto newspaper. She wrote about the quantum technology revolution and related that the "policy failure" of the 2003 Iraq War was due to "outdated intelligence, lack of ability to test agent information against other sources and misinterpretation of apparent battlefield evidence".

Positions
Neville-Jones is an honorary fellow of Lady Margaret Hall, Oxford, and an honorary doctor of the University of London and the Open University.  In August 2013, the Council on CyberSecurity announced that she had joined the organization's Advisory Board.

Honours
Appointed a Companion of the Order of St Michael and St George (CMG) in the 1987 Birthday Honours, she was raised to Dame Commander (DCMG) in the 1995 New Year's Honours. Neville-Jones also received the Légion d'honneur (Chevalier) in 2009. She was recognized as one of the BBC's 100 women of 2013.

Styles
 Pauline Neville-Jones (1939–1987)
 Pauline Neville-Jones, CMG (1987–1995)
 Dame Pauline Neville-Jones, DCMG (1995–2007)
 The Right Honourable The Baroness Neville-Jones, DCMG (2007–2010)<ref name="Debrett's People of Today">[http://www.debretts.com/people-of-today/profile/36961/(Lilian)-Pauline-Neville-Jones-NEVILLE-JONES Debrett's People of Today]</ref>
 The Right Honourable'' The Baroness Neville-Jones, DCMG PC (2010–present)

References

External links
 Profile on the Conservative Party website
 Guardian, 3 July 2007 Joining the Shadow Team
 Hansard, 15 October 2007, Introduction to the House of Lords
 Interview with the Alligator magazine, 23 January 2010

1939 births
Living people
People educated at Leeds Girls' High School
Alumni of Lady Margaret Hall, Oxford
Fellows of Lady Margaret Hall, Oxford
BBC Governors
Chairs of the Joint Intelligence Committee (United Kingdom)
Civil servants in the Cabinet Office
Conservative Party (UK) life peers
Diplomatic peers
Dames Commander of the Order of St Michael and St George
Chevaliers of the Légion d'honneur
Members of HM Diplomatic Service
Qinetiq
BBC 100 Women
Members of the Privy Council of the United Kingdom
British women diplomats
20th-century British diplomats
Life peeresses created by Elizabeth II